100 Bucks is a 2012 Namibian short film directed by Oshosheni Hiveluah and co–produced by Cecil Moller and Mutaleni Nadimi. The film focused an urban story of the journey of a 100-Namibia Dollar-note that passes from hands of wealth to hands of need and through thieving hands.

The film received positive reviews and won several awards at international film festivals. The film won the Audience Choice Award at the 2012 Namibia Film and Theatre Awards. In 2011, Oshosheni received the Focus Features Africa First program Prize for 100 Bucks. 100 Bucks also won the 2012 Namibian Theatre and Film Audience Choice award. 100 Bucks was screened in London by the non-profit organization AfricAvenir Windhoek as well as in New York in 2012 at the African Diaspora International Film Festival (ADIFF).

Plot

Cast
 Steven Afrikaner as Tsotsi 2
 Sylvanie Beukes as Dantagob
 Girley Jazama as Maria
 Perivi Katjavivi as Nolan
 Victor Mtambanengwe as Elvis
 David Ndjavera as Taxi Driver
 Lynn Strydom as Tameka
 Tanya Terblanche as Reyna
 Ripuree Tjitendero as Lia
 Onesmus Uupindi as Tsotsi 1

References

External links
 
 Official trailer

2012 films
Namibian documentary films
2012 short documentary films
Namibian short films